Jeffrey Kaplan may refer to:

 Jeffrey Kaplan (born 1954), American academic
 Jeffrey Kaplan (born 1972), American video game designer